Lenticle may refer to:

 A small lens. 
 A glass panel in a clock case through which one can see the movement of the pendulum. 
 A lens-shaped layer of mineral or rock embedded in a different material. 
 Lenticels: small brown corky spots on the surface of stems and roots of plants.
 A freckle or other pigmented spot.